Sir Charles William Oatley OBE, FRS FREng (14 February 1904 – 11 March 1996) was Professor of Electrical Engineering, University of Cambridge, 1960–1971, and developer of one of the first commercial scanning electron microscopes. He was also a founder member of the Royal Academy of Engineering.

Biography
He was born in Frome on Valentine's Day, 14 February 1904.  A plaque has been placed on the house at the junction of Badcox Parade and Catherine Hill.

He was educated at Bedford Modern School and St. John's College, Cambridge. He lectured at King's College London for 12 years, until the war. He was a director of the English Electric Valve Company from 1966 to 1985.

In 1969 he was elected to the Royal Society.

Oatley also received an Honorary Doctorate from Heriot-Watt University in 1974. In that same year, he was knighted.

He received an Honorary Degree (Doctor of Science) from the University of Bath in 1977.
He retired from the English Electric Valve Company in 1985.

He was awarded the Howard N. Potts Medal in 1989. He died on 11 March 1996.

Graduate students
Oatley and the graduate students he supervised made substantial contributions, particularly to the development of the scanning electron microscope (SEM).

His students included:

Thomas Everhart, former President of Caltech
Alec Broers, former Vice-Chancellor of the University of Cambridge and former president of the Royal Academy of Engineering.
Haroon Ahmed, former Master of Corpus Christi College, Cambridge and Professor of Microelectronics

References

External links 
Charles Oatley: Pioneer of Scanning Electron Microscopy
The Papers of Sir Charles Oatley held at Churchill Archives Centre accessed 2 July 2008

1904 births
1996 deaths
People educated at Bedford Modern School
Alumni of St John's College, Cambridge
Academics of King's College London
British physicists
British electronics engineers
Fellows of Trinity College, Cambridge
Fellows of the Royal Academy of Engineering
Fellows of the Royal Society
Knights Bachelor
Officers of the Order of the British Empire
Royal Medal winners
People from Frome
Howard N. Potts Medal recipients
Engineering professors at the University of Cambridge